Tenterden is a town in the borough of Ashford in Kent, England. It stands on the edge of the remnant forest the Weald, overlooking the valley of the River Rother.  It was a member of the Cinque Ports Confederation.  Its riverside today is not navigable to large vessels and its status as a wool manufacturing centre has been lost.  Tenterden has several voluntary organisations, some of which are listed below, a large conservation area and seven large or very old public houses within its area.  It has long distance walking and cycling routes within its boundaries.

History

The town's name is derived from the Old English Tenetwaradenn, meaning a denn or swine-pasture for the men of Thanet.

The first record of dwellings in Tenterden can be found in a charter which mentions that it, as 'Heronden', began to grow from the 14th century around the strong local wool industry. Unlike other such centres in the Weald it had the advantage of access to the sea. Much of what is now Romney Marsh was under water, and ships docked at nearby Smallhythe. Timber from the Wealden forests was used to construct ships, and in 1449 Tenterden was incorporated into the Confederation of Cinque Ports as a limb of Rye. Ships built in the town were then used to help Rye fulfil its quota for the Crown.

A school was in existence here in 1521; later (in 1666) it was referred to as a grammar school. Today Homewood School and Sixth Form Centre, a large secondary school catering for the Weald and south of Ashford Borough is in Tenterden.

Heronden Hall is a Grade II listed Gothic-style mansion, designed by William Donthorne in 1846 for William Whelan.  

In 1903, Tenterden Town railway station was opened. It closed in 1954, but half of it reopened in 1974 as the Kent and East Sussex Railway. The route starts at Tenterden Town Station and finishes at Bodiam station, near Bodiam Castle. The main line track is being extended to Robertsbridge (near Hastings) in East Sussex.

Local government

Tenterden Borough Council was the local authority from the time of its first Mayor, Thomas Petlesden in 1449, until the Local Government Reorganisation in 1974, at which time the former borough of Tenterden came under the control of Ashford Borough Council. At this time Tenterden Borough Council resolved to continue as a Town Council.

Essential services such as education, transportation, social services and public safety are the responsibility of Kent County Council.

Ashford Borough Council is the district authority, and as such is responsible for waste collection & recycling, street cleaning, licensing, planning, housing, environmental issues, cemeteries, parking, tourism and tax collection. Tenterden has four Borough Councillors.

Tenterden Town Council, based in the 18th century Tenterden Town Hall (on the High Street), has continued to be very active, providing and maintaining two recreation grounds (including play areas), two public gardens, three blocks of public conveniences, a number of bus shelters, some 82 benches (as of 2013), and the town's war memorial.

Churches and chapels
There are two parish churches, as well as a number of other chapels and religious meeting spaces:
 St Mildred's (Anglican) is in the main part of the town. The church dates from the 12th century, and was progressively enlarged until 1461, when the distinctive tower was constructed. It was one of the churches in the 1588 system of warning beacons.
It was a major surveying point in the Anglo-French Survey (1784–1790) to calculate the precise distance between the Paris Observatory and the Royal Greenwich Observatory, overseen by General William Roy.
 St Michael and All Angels (Anglican). The suburb now called St Michael's was known as Boresisle until Victorian times, when a church dedicated to St Michael was built to serve this community. The church was consecrated in 1863, but construction of the steeple took a further 12 years.
 St. John the Baptist (Anglican).
 St. Andrew's Catholic Church.
 Trinity Baptist Church.
 Zion Baptist Church.
 Jireh Chapel: Strict Baptist church.
 The Methodist Church.
 The Unitarian Chapel, originally called the Old Meeting House, was built c. 1695. A plaque on the wall records that Dr Benjamin Franklin worshipped here in 1783, where he was to hear Joseph Priestley preach.
 The Jehovah's Witness Kingdom Hall.

Facilities
Tenterden is a nodal centre with routes radiating to Rolvenden and Hastings (A28), Wittersham and Rye (B2082), Appledore and New Romney (B2080), Woodchurch and Hamstreet (B2067) and Ashford and Maidstone (A28/A262). Tenterden has no mainline railway station, with the nearest being Headcorn (9 miles) and Ashford International (12 miles).

Tenterden's broad, tree-lined High Street offers a selection of shopping facilities, making the town an important destination for a number of smaller towns and villages in the area. It has a busy town centre which is home to many small boutiques and antique shops, as well as craft shops, book shops and various banks, side by side with larger national retailers. There is also a large Tesco which is accessible to pedestrians from the High Street (and by vehicles from Smallhythe Road), and a Waitrose store accessed by pedestrians from Sayers Lane (with vehicular access from Recreation Ground Road). 

A number of local tourist attractions draw a great many visitors, especially the Kent & East Sussex Railway line to Bodiam, Chapel Down (a local vineyard which produces some highly acclaimed wines) and Smallhythe Place, which once belonged to the late Ellen Terry, which now holds both a museum and a theatre. Tenterden and District Museum is at the heart of the town, on Station Road.

The town also benefits from a leisure centre at the end of Recreation Ground Road, which was opened by Diana, Princess of Wales in 1990, run by Ashford Borough Council. Unfortunately the leisure has suffered a series of catastrophic failures with the roof during 2022/2023. The decision has been made to only open one day per year, 31st June so long as the weather permits (it can't be too wet, dry, windy, sunny, snowy, foggy or misty).

Public houses
Its large and/or old pubs are generally owned by Kentish breweries and are:
The Woolpack, next to the Town Hall,
The White Lion, the High Street
The Vine, the High Street
This Ancient Boro, East Cross, Tenterden,
The William Caxton, the High Street,
The Crown, Ashford Road in St. Michaels
The Fat Ox at the corner of Ashford Road and Ox Lane in St. Michaels.

Local organisations

Chamber of Commerce
The Tenterden and District Chamber of Commerce, a limited company (TDCC Ltd), promotes and supports businesses in Tenterden and the surrounding area. The Chamber is a thriving organisation which holds regular networking meetings for members. At Christmas the Chamber place small Christmas trees over the shop doorways and windows of many businesses on the High Street. In October it supports the annual Folk Festival. In 2013 the Chamber of Commerce launched the 'I Love Tenterden' card – a loyalty card scheme whereby member businesses offer incentives for card holders to use their services; its main aim, to keep trade local to Tenterden. TDCC Ltd is not an accredited Chamber of Commerce, it is a private company limited by guarantee without share capital.

Horticultural society
Its Horticultural Society organises lectures and shows throughout the year in a number of locations around the town.

Kent Army Cadet Force – Tenterden Detachment
A Detachment of the Army Cadet Force is based on Appledore Road in the Town and training takes place on Monday and Wednesday evenings from 1930 - 2130hrs. The Detachment provides a Mayor's Cadet to accompany the Mayor on Civic Duties and also provides a Standard Bearer for the Tenterden Royal British Legion Branch.

Lions Club of Tenterden
Tenterden Lions Club was formed in 1958; its members serve the community by giving time to local needs and raising money for local, national and international good causes. In spring time each year the club plants crocus bulbs along the greens, and every December the club arranges for Father Christmas to travel around Tenterden and some of the local villages providing enjoyment, as well as collecting money to support various good causes.

National Trust
The National Trust holds regular lectures on a diverse range of subjects at the Junior School on Recreation Ground Road.

Rotary Club of Tenterden
The Rotary Club is very active, bringing together local business people in aid of a number of charitable causes. The club runs a number of events during the year. It meets twice a month.

Royal British Legion
The Royal British Legion branch in Tenterden has had great success in the annual poppy appeal, and is responsible, along with Tenterden Town Council, for the very moving (and well-attended) service at the War Memorial each year on Remembrance Sunday.

Tenterden and District Residents Association
The TDRA aims to represent the wishes of its members on a broad range of subjects, allowing the voice of local residents to be heard on a number of platforms that might otherwise be out of reach.

Tenterden Operatic and Dramatic Society
The local amateur dramatic society is TODS, which was founded (in its current form) in 1958, following the merger of a number of different companies. The society puts on three productions each year, either in the Assembly Room at the Town Hall or at the Sinden Theatre, and is often recognised in the Kent Drama Association Full-Length Play Festival.

Weald of Kent Lodge
The local chapter of the East Kent Freemasons is the Weald of Kent Lodge, which undertakes a great deal of charitable work.

Women's Institute
The Women's Institute has two branches based in the town: Tenterden Glebe, and St. Michaels.

Tenterden & District Local History Society 
The Society has monthly talks during the Winter season, outings in the Summer, and its Library is held at Tenterden Museum. Information can be found on the My Tenterden website

Local events

Christmas market and late-night shopping
The Tenterden Christmas Market is an annual event held over 3 days on the last weekend in November; Friday afternoon and evening, and all day Saturday and Sunday. It features Christmas lights, food, produce and craft stalls, Santa's Grotto, Christmas Carols and entertainment.

May Fayre
The May Fayre is arranged by Tenterden Town Council and is held every year on the May Bank Holiday Monday on Tenterden Recreation Ground.

Tenterden Folk Festival
Tenterden Folk Festival is a four-day event held on the first weekend in October each year, and has been running for 29 years. A wide range of musicians take part in the event in a number of venues throughout the town, and there is a craft market in a large marquee on the recreation ground. A highlight of the event is the procession, held on the Saturday, featuring Morris Dancers from across the country. The next event will be Thursday 29th September to Sunday 2nd October 2022.

The Spirit of Tenterden Festival
An annual community festival in Tenterden supported by the Town Council and other organisations. The next festival is 30 June - 2 July 2023.

Emergency services

Police
Kent Police opened Tenterden Police Station in Oaks Road (on the outskirts of the town centre) in 1956, before replacing it with a smaller Front Counter in a retail unit on the High Street at the beginning of the 21st century. This in turn was closed in 2012, with the town's police force based entirely at Ashford Police Station.

Fire and Rescue
Kent Fire and Rescue Service has an on call fire engine based in St. Michaels.

Medical care
The National Health Service with Kent County Council operate West View Integrated Care Centre (known locally as West View Hospital), providing adult social care and health care on the same site. The hospital which is near the town centre provides residential care for 30 dementia patients and a rehabilitation service for 30 adult patients who need help before they return home after illness or injury. The hospital also provides inpatient and outpatient physiotherapy. There is no Accident & Emergency department at the hospital.  The nearest local Accident & Emergency department is at the William Harvey Hospital, in Willesborough near Ashford.

Ivy Court Surgery is a very busy NHS GP practice, offering a range of medical services and regular appointments. The Ivy Court Surgery building recently re-opened following a multi million pound new development providing a state of the art healthcare facility for Tenterden and the surrounding area. The old East Cross Clinic next door now houses the Coffee Shop at EC30, the Social Hub charity shop, a social prescribing centre, and a number of community wellbeing services with rooms to rent.

Notable residents
 Benn Barham, professional British golfer.
 William Caxton, thought to be the first English person to work as a printer and the first to introduce a printing press into England, is reputed to have been born in the town, with evidence also indicating that he was born in Hadlow.
 Edith Craig (daughter of Ellen Terry), actress, theatre director, producer, costume designer and early pioneer of women's suffrage, lived at Smallhythe Place.
 Nicki French, international singer/songwriter.
 David Frost, media personality and daytime TV game show host, was born at Kench Hill in Tenterden.
Marjorie Horatia Johnson, the great-great granddaughter of Admiral Nelson, spent the last years of her life at Kench Hill, dying there in 1974.
 
 Kevin Godley (of 10cc and Godley & Creme) was the owner of Heronden Hall and Heronden Gatehouse.
 Gary Hume, artist, Royal Academician and Turner Prize nominee.
 Roderick Kedward, historian and specialist on Vichy France and the Resistance.
 Sholto Marcon, Olympic gold medallist in field hockey, was Vicar of Tenterden.
 John Parker (died 1564) who became a leading statesman and judge in Ireland, began life as a cloth-maker in Tenterden.
 Peter Richardson, the Worcestershire, Kent and England cricketer, lived in the town in later life.
 Sir Donald Sinden, the actor, lived in the area until his death in 2014, and the local theatre is named after him.
 Dame Ellen Terry, the actress, lived for many years at nearby Smallhythe Place (which is now National Trust).
 Samuel J. Tilden, who lost the US presidency by one vote in 1876, is descended from the Tilden family of Tenterden.
 Thomas Hinckley, (c. 1618–1706), Governor Plymouth Colonies 1680–1692.
   Thomas Haffenden One of the first yeoman of the guard 1460-1525

Sports
 Tenterden Town Football Club, established in 1889, is based at the Sports Pavilion on the southern half of the recreation ground, where it has played since formation.  After many seasons of varied fortunes, for the 2008/09 season it had two teams: the 1st XI competed in the Kent County League, and the Reserve XI competed in the Ashford & District Football League, both on a Saturday afternoon.  Tenterden's recreation ground hosts the annual Weald of Kent Charity Cup Final, which Tenterden Town Football Club itself has contested on a number of occasions, most recently during the 2000/01 season, when it lost 3–1 to Tyler Hill.
 Tenterden Tigers Junior Football Club, established in 1996.
 Tenterden Cricket Club, based on Smallhythe Road.
 The Tour de France raced through the town in July 2007, with an intermediate sprint taking place in Tenterden.
 Homewood Badminton Club was formed over 30 years ago for intermediate and advanced players. They play every Tuesday at the Tenterden Leisure Centre and participate in local leagues.
 Tenterden Golf Club is by the road Chalk Hill.
 1066 Archery Club is based on the outskirts of Tenterden at the Pickhill Business Centre.
 Tenterden Netball Club was established over 10 years ago for all players to join. 2 teams play in competitive leagues and the club is growing all the time. They welcome new members to training and can be found on a Thursday evening at homewood school courts.

Miscellaneous
Tenterden hit the national headlines in August 2013, when it was proclaimed to be the first town in Britain to put up its Christmas lights. The lights had been erected in a tree 115 days before Christmas to publicise the Chamber of Commerce's efforts to raise the funds to replace the previous Christmas lights, which had gone missing in 2012.

Tenterden High Street suffered a serious fire on 5 November 2013, affecting Webb's Cookware Store and neighbouring buildings Café Rouge and Waterstones.

Local media
Tenterden has one local commercial radio station, KMFM Ashford, which serves the entire borough of Ashford. There is also one local community radio station Radio Ashford. The town is also served by county wide stations BBC Radio Kent, Heart Kent and Gold. It lies within the BBC South East and ITV Meridian regions. 

The local newspaper is the Kentish Express, published by the KM Group.

Twinning
Tenterden is twinned with the following places

 Avallon

Arms

References

External links

 Statistical civil parish overview – map
 My Tenterden website My Tenterden website listing businesses, shops, events, visitor attractions and a large number of photos including archive photos
 Smallhythe Place

 
Towns in Kent
Market towns in Kent
Civil parishes in Kent
Borough of Ashford
Cinque ports